Reja is a decorative iron screen.

Reja may also refer to:

 Matic Reja, a Slovenian footballer
 Edoardo Reja, Italian football coach and former player